Ash-Shu‘ara’ (The Poets) is the 26th chapter (sūrah) of the Qurʾan with 227 verses (āyāt). Many of these verses are very short. The chapter is named from the word Ash-Shu'ara in ayat 224.

The chapter talks about various prophets and their tribes, and how the disbelievers were destroyed after threatening the prophets with death. It also talks about the mercy of God (Allah). This surah starts with the story of Moses, followed by that of Abraham.

Regarding the timing and contextual background of the revelation (asbāb al-nuzūl), it is an earlier "Meccan surah", which means it is believed to have been revealed in Mecca. The topic and the style appear, and the traditions affirm, that it was uncovered during the center Makkan period. As indicated by Ibn Abbas, Surah Ta-Ha was uncovered first, at that point Surah Al-Waqiah, and afterward Surah Ash-Shu'ara.

Summary

1-2 Muhammad is grieved at the unbelief of the Quraish
3-4 God will grant them no miracle save the Quran
5 The Quraish regard the Quran as a forgery
5-8 God will send a grim messenger whom they shall respect
 The story of Moses
9-10 He is sent to Pharaoh and his people
11-12 Fearing that he will be called an impostor, Moses asks that Aaron be sent with him
13-16 Moses being assured that he will not be put to death for murder, is sent to demand release of the Israelites
17-18 Pharaoh charges Moses with ingratitude
19-21 Moses apologises to Pharaoh for killing the Egyptian
22-27 Moses is charged with being a madman
28 Pharaoh threatens Moses if he do not worship him
29-32 Moses performs miracles before Pharaoh
33-41 Egyptian magicians called to compete with Moses
42-47 Moses contests with the magicians, who are converted
48-49 Pharaoh, enraged, threatens to crucify the magicians
50-51 The magician converts put their trust in God
52 Moses commanded to take Israelites forth from Egypt
53-60 Pharaoh and his people pursue them
61-65 The Red Sea is divided by Moses, and Israelites pass over
66-68 The Egyptians are drowned, and become a warning to all unbelievers
 The story of Abraham
69-82 He preaches against idolatry
83-92 Abraham prays for himself and his father
93-102 He warns his people of the vain repentance of idolaters in hell
103, 104 Most of his people rejected him
 The story of Noah
105 His people accused him of imposture
106-110 Noah exhorts them to have faith in God
111-115 Unbelievers desire Noah to reject his poor followers
116 Refusing, they threaten him with violence
117-119 Noah takes refuge in God, and is saved in the ark
120-122 The unbelievers are drowned
The History of Hūd
123 They charge God's messengers with imposture
124-135 Húd claims the prophetic office, and preaches to the Ádites
136-139 They reject Hud's warnings and charge him with imposture
139-140 The unbelieving Ádites are destroyed
 The story of the Thamúdites
141 They charge the prophets with imposture
142-152 Sálih, declaring himself a prophet, preaches to them
153 The Thamúdites reject Sálih and call him a madman
154-156 They demand a sign, and a she-camel is given for a sign
157-159 They slay the she-camel, and are destroyed for infidelity
 The story of Lot	
160 The Sodomites accuse their prophets with imposture
161-166 Lot proclaims himself a prophet, and preaches to them
167 The Sodomites threaten him with violence
168-171 God saves Lot from Sodom, but Lot's wife is destroyed
172-174 The unbelievers destroyed by a shower of stones
 The story of the Midianites
175 They call God's messengers impostors
176-184 Shuaib proclaims himself a prophet, and preaches to them
185-187 They call him a madman and a liar, and challenge him to cause the heavens fall on them
188-191 They are destroyed in their unbelief
192-195 The Quran given to Muhammad, through Gabriel, in the Arabic language
196-197 The Quran attested as God's Word by the former Scriptures
198-203 The hearts of the Quraish are hardened by the Quran
204 The Quraish scorn Muhammad's threatenings
205-207 God's mercy deepens the condemnation of impenitent infidels
208-209 God never destroys a people without first warning them
210-212 The Devil did not assist in revealing the Quran
213-214 Muhammad warned against idolatry, and admonished to preach Islam to his relatives
215-220 True believers to be treated meekly, and unbelievers to be treated with forbearance
221-223 Devils descend on the hearts of unbelievers
224-227 Unbelieving poets are mad; believing poets commended
227 The unjust will speedily be punished 

The significant issues, divine laws, and direction revealed in the surah can be listed as follows:-

 God's address to Muhammad that he ought not fuss himself to death with distress for the individuals' disbelief. 
 Story of Moses, Pharaoh, and redemption of the offspring of Israel. 
 Story of Ibrahim and his contentions against idol worshippers. 
 The way that the idolaters  and their false-deities will both be toppled into hellfire. 
 Accounts of Prophets Noah, Lot,  Hud, Saleh, Shuaib and their people. 
 Qur'an is uncovered in the Arabic language
 Satan plunge on those corrupt delinquents who tune in to gossip and are liars.

Notable verses

214  Warning Verse

Exegesis
The foundation of the chapter 26 is that the disbelievers of Makkah were in constant refusal to acknowledge the message of Islam given by Muhammad, stating that he did not provide evidence to support his claim to prophethood. They would mark him as a poet or a magician, mock his message and disparage his Mission. This situation was making incredible anguish and despondency for Muhammad.

The Chapter starts with uplifting statements to Muhammad, inferring, 
 For what reason do you fuss for their sake? If these individuals have not had believed in you, it is because they are stubborn, not the lack of signs for them. They will not yield to common sense they need to see a Sign which makes them bow their heads in inquietude. When this Sign appears at the appropriate time of time, they will themselves understand that what was being introduced to them was the Truth.

After this discourse, up to verse 191, very much the same topic has been introduced persistently, and it is stated: 
 The entire earth possesses large amounts of such Signs as can bring a truth-searcher to The Reality, yet the obstinate and misguided individuals have never accepted significantly in the wake of seeing the Signs, regardless of whether these were the Indications of the natural phenomena or the miracles of the Prophets. These pathetic individuals have determinedly clung to their wrong statements of faith till the Divine scourge really overwhelmed them."

Hadith about Ash-Shu'ara
The first and foremost exegesis/tafsir of the Qur'an is found in hadith of Muhammad. Ḥadīth (حديث) is literally "speech" or "report", that is a recorded saying or tradition of Muhammad validated by isnad; with Sirah Rasul Allah these comprise the sunnah and reveal shariah. According to Aishah, the life of Prophet Muhammad was practical implementation of Qur'an. So mention of a surah in hadith elevates the importance of that particular surah from certain aspect.

 It is narrated on the authority of Aisha that when this verse (Q26.214) was revealed: " And warn thy nearest kindred," the Messenger of Allah (ﷺ) stood up on Safa and said: O Fatimah, daughter of Muhammad. O Safiyya bint Abd al-Muttalib, daughter of Abd al-Muttalib, O sons of 'Abd al-Muttalib. Ask what you wish from my property, but I cannot save you from Allah (if you disobey Him).
 Narrated Ibn Abbas: When the Verse:-- 'And warn your tribe of near kindred' (Q26.214). was revealed, the Prophet (ﷺ) started calling every tribe by its name, "O Bani Fihr!, O Banu Adi!, O people of Quraysh!"
 Narrated Ibn `Abbas: When the Verse:--'And warn your tribe of near-kindred (Q26.214), was revealed, the Prophet (ﷺ) ascended the Safa (mountain) and started calling, "O Bani Fihr!, O Banu Adi!, 0 sons of Abd Manaf ibn Qusai! " addressing various tribes of Quraysh till they were assembled. Those who could not come themselves, sent their messengers to see what was there. Abū Lahab and other people from Quraish came and the Prophet (ﷺ) then said, "Suppose I told you that there is an (enemy) cavalry in the valley intending to attack you, would you believe me?" They said, "Yes, for we have not found you telling anything other than the truth." He then said, "I am a warner to you in face of a terrific punishment." Abu Lahab said (to the Prophet) "May your hands perish all this day. Is it for this purpose you have gathered us?" Then it(surah Al-Masad) was revealed: "Perish the hands of Abu Lahab (one of the Prophet's uncles), and perish he! His wealth and his children will not profit him...." (Q111.1–5)

Notes

References

External links
Quran 26 Clear Quran translation
Q26:2, 50+ translations, islamawakened.com

Shuara
Tribes of Arabia
Articles about multiple people in the Quran